Gonzalo Orquín is a Spanish artist and photographer based in Rome, Italy, best known for his controversial 2013 photo series, titled "Sí, quiero", featuring gay and lesbian couples kissing in Roman Catholic churches in Rome.

Biography

Early life and education 
Orquín was born in Seville, Spain, in 1982. He studied Fine Arts at the University of Seville from 2000 to 2004 and the University of Perugia in Italy in 2005. He moved to Italy from Spain in 2004.

Career 
The Leslie-Lohman Museum of Gay and Lesbian Art has described his works as "pronouncedly domestic, intimate, post-coital, and romantic. Set in common place interiors of muted tones, his subjects which include cats, dogs, solitary men and women, as well as gay and straight couples, display a contemplative depth of emotion."

His first exhibition was in 2000 in Seville, when he was only 18 years old. His next exhibition was in Sulmona, Italy, in 2006, and most of rest of his more than 20 recent exhibitions have been in Italy as well, though he has been featured in galleries in France, Mexico, the Netherlands, and the United States.

Sí, quiero 
In 2013, Orquín shot a photo series of gay and lesbian couples, mostly friends and acquaintances, kissing in Roman Catholic churches in Rome. He planned to include the photos in an exhibition titled "Trialogo," which was scheduled to open at the Galleria L'Opera in Rome.

However, before they could be shown, Vatican City officials sent a letter threatening legal action should the photos be shown. Spokesman Claudio Tanturri told a newspaper that the photos violate the Constitution of Italy, saying:"Italian constitutional law safeguards an individual’s religious feeling and the function of places of worship. Therefore photos that are not suitable and do not conform to the spirituality of the place offend and infringe upon the advancement of man in the particular place for the expression of faith."Orquín spoke to lawyers and decided not to exhibit the photos "for security reasons," but maintained that lawyers were working on the case and that he hoped the photos would be shown eventually. As an act of protest, he posted on his Facebook page a picture of the photos on the museum wall covered in black paper and crosses fashioned out of black tape pasted to the wall. Orquín told reporters that he found Italy to be "a very homophobic country," saying "There aren't other countries in Europe or the West that are backward like this."

Gay rights groups in Italy were quick to protest. Flavio Romani, President of the group Arcigay, strongly criticized the Vatican's reaction, saying:"In the images in which the church have seen provocation, I see an exchange of love, a type of public worship that creates harmony not contrast. The indignation of the Catholic Church, therefore, is extremely grotesque."In 2014, it was announced that the Leslie-Lohman Museum of Gay and Lesbian Art would be hosting the exhibit under the title, "Si, quiero", (English: "Yes, I want").

Exhibitions 
 2017, Washington D.C: Italy in U.S. Italian embassy; LIBROGRAFÌE 
 2016, Palermo: Cantieri culturali alla Zisa, Sicilia Queer/ Arti Visive/ Something Queer. Corpo, territorio di relazioni
 2016, Rome: Ministero dei Beni e delle Attività Culturali, Biblioteca Angelica. Concorso "Oltre i libri" Vincitore categoria grafica
 2016, Mattelica: Palazzo degli Ottoni; Lo so, in viaggio per Pasolini
 2015, Rome: Casa delle Letterature; LIBROGRAFìE
2014, Rome: M.A.A.M.; La cappella porcina e-maamcipazione
 2014, Perugia: Galleria Nazionale dell'Umbria; ARTSIDERS
 2014, New York City: Leslie-Lohman Museum, Windows Gallery; Sí, quiero
 2014, Rome: Real Academia de España; El día y la noche
 2014, Tijuana, Mexico: Imperfectu International Film and Gender Studies Festival; Yes, I do
 2014, Groningen, Netherlands: Galerie Mooiman; Duals
 2013, Rome: Galleria L’Opera; Trialogo
 2012, Florence: Museo Nazionale Alinari della Fotografia; Un secolo e sette. Premio Fabbri per l'Arte 
 2012, Bologna: Galleria Nazionale dell'Accademia di Belle Arti di Bologna; Un secolo e sette. Premio Fabbri per l'Arte
 2012, Seville: Fundación Cajasol; Bailando en la oscuridad, el despertar creativo
 2011, Campobasso: University of Molise. Progetto Aratro Papiroflexia
 2011, Rome: Galleria Arscritica Modernaecontemporanea. Il pensiero fatto segno_Opere su carta dal primo '900 ad oggi 
 2011, Rome: Studio Andrea Gobbi; Vita in Studio
 2009, Rimini: Castel Sismondo e Palazzo del Podestà. Biennale di Rimini; Conteplazioni.Bellezza e tradizione del nuovo nella pittura italiana contemporanea
 2008, Milan: Veronesi Foundation; Il seno nell'Arte
 2008, Berlin: Werkstatt Gallery
 2008, Rome: Galleria Chiari; La poesia del corpo
 2007, Paris: Galerie Myriam Haas; Natures Vives
 2007, Milan: Palazzo della Ragione; Da Von Gloeden a Pierre et Gilles
 2007, Francavilla al Mare, Chieti: 58º Edizione Premio Michetti; Nuovi Realismi 
 2007, Florence: Palazzina Reale; Da Von Gloeden a Pierre et Gilles
 2006, Rome: Studio Andrea Gobbi; Espejo romano. 
 2000, Seville: Sala de Antigüedades y subastas de Sevilla; pintores Noveles

References 

1982 births
Living people
Spanish photographers
Spanish contemporary artists
People from Seville